Liberty Science Center is an interactive science museum and learning center located in Liberty State Park in Jersey City, New Jersey, United States. At its opening, it was the largest such planetarium in the Western Hemisphere and the world's fourth largest.

The center, which opened in 1993 as New Jersey's first major state science museum, has science exhibits, numerous educational resources, and the original Hoberman sphere, a silver, computer-driven engineering artwork designed by Chuck Hoberman.

History

Liberty Science Center completed a 22-month, $109 million expansion and renewal project on July 19, 2007.

In December 2017, the Science Center opened the Jennifer Chalsty Planetarium, a 400-seat facility with a dome  in diameter and an  diameter screen, named for the benefactor who contributed $5 million towards the cost of construction. Larger than New York City's Hayden Planetarium, at its opening, it was the largest such planetarium in the Western Hemisphere and the world's fourth largest.

Exhibits

Liberty Science Center's permanent exhibitions include:
 Skyscraper! Achievement and Impact – Believed to be the most comprehensive exhibit on the topic of skyscrapers, which includes large models of some of the world's tallest buildings and explanations of various aspects of their construction, such as the physics of elevator operation, and test chamber that vets the strength of materials used to the buildings.
 Eat and Be Eaten – This exhibit of unusual live animals explores the predator-prey relationship, including  vipers, puffer fish,  cotton-top tamarins, brilliantly colored poison dart frogs, eusocial naked mole-rats and fungus culturing, leaf cutter ants.

 Communication is a 7,000-square foot exhibit that explores human communication, which can be experienced by the visitor via mobile devices, multimedia, and touch, through speech, writing and symbols. The exhibit also explains how technology plays a role in modern forms of communication.
 Traveling exhibitions – Various temporary exhibits
 "Mammoths and Mastodons: Titans of the Ice Age" used video installations, hands-on interactive displays, life-sized models and fossils to teach more about extinct mammals. The exhibit showcased Lyuba, the world's best-preserved woolly mammoth specimen.
 Titanic: The Artifact Exhibition featured over 100 authentic artifacts from the Titanic, which were set within replicas of cabins and other areas of the ship. The exhibit also allowed visitors to touch an "iceberg" to simulate how cold the water was when the ship sank.
 Rubik's Cube exhibition - Beyond Rubik's Cube opened to the public on April 26, 2014, and has toured other museums around the world. The exhibition celebrates the Cube's 40th anniversary and features artifacts and exhibits that trace the history of the Cube and mark the massive cultural influence it continues to have on popular culture today.

Jennifer Chalsty Center for Science Learning and Teaching
In July 2007,  the Jennifer Chalsty Center for Science Learning and Teaching opened.  It is a  facility extending over the entire former Invention Floor of Liberty Science Center, with six laboratories, a 150-seat theater, and other resources for teachers and students. Educators can upgrade science teaching skills and find peers to help strengthen science instruction in the classroom, while students can participate in intense, multi-day or single-hour programs to ignite interest and skills in science exploration.

Genius Award and Gallery
The LSC hosts an annual Gala and Genius Award as well as Genius Gallery, a permanent, interactive display. The full list of awardees:
2011: Jane Goodall; 
2012: Temple Grandin, Ernő Rubik, Oliver Sacks; 
2013: Sir Richard Branson, Garry Kasparov, Cori Bargmann; 
2014: Dean Kamen, Sylvia A. Earle, J. Craig Venter; 
2015: Jeff Bezos, Vint Cerf, Jill Tarter; 
2016: Frank Gehry, Jack Horner, Ellen Langer, Kip Thorne; 
2017: Katherine Johnson, Ray Kurzweil, Marc Raibert (and SpotMini); 
2018: Vitalik Buterin, George M. Church, Laurie Santos, Sara Seager;
2019: Chris Messina, Sally Shaywitz and Bennett Shaywitz, Martine Rothblatt, Karlie Kloss;
2020: Moshe Safdie, Jennifer A. Lewis, William Conan Davis.

Sci Tech Scity proposal
In 2019 LSC was in negotiation with Jersey City to receive for a nominal fee city-owned land (a former car pound) which would be developed as an educational and residential area called Sci Tech Scity. Phase one of the project is scheduled to open in late 2023 and into early 2024.

References

Further reading

External links 

 

IMAX venues
Museums established in 1993
Buildings and structures in Jersey City, New Jersey
Natural history museums in New Jersey
Science museums in New Jersey
Museums in Hudson County, New Jersey
Tourist attractions in Jersey City, New Jersey
Association of Science-Technology Centers member institutions
1993 establishments in New Jersey
Planetaria in the United States